Pandesma robusta is a species of moth of the family Erebidae. It is found in Portugal, Spain, Malta, Sicily, Greece, Crete, the Canary Islands, throughout Africa and from Asia Minor to India and Pakistan.

Adults are on wing year round. There are multiple generations per year.

The larvae feed on Acacia, Albizzia lebbek and Populus euphratica.

External links
africanmoths.com
Fauna Europaea
lepiforum.de

Pandesmini
Moths of Europe
Moths of Cape Verde
Moths of Africa
Moths of the Middle East
Moths of Asia
Moths described in 1858
Taxa named by Francis Walker (entomologist)